The White Conduit Club (WCC) was a cricket club based on the northern fringes of London that existed from about 1782 until 1788. Although short-lived, it had considerable significance in the history of the game, as its members created the first Lord's venue and reorganised themselves as the new Marylebone Cricket Club (MCC).

The WCC took its name from White Conduit Fields in Islington, where it was based until 1787. It was essentially a gentlemen's club for those with amateur status but it employed professional cricketers who provided coaching for the members and sometimes played in the club's matches; one of these was the bowler Thomas Lord, after whom Lord's is named. The most significant members were Charles Lennox, 4th Duke of Richmond and George Finch, 9th Earl of Winchilsea who employed Lord to find a new, private venue for the club after complaints that White Conduit Fields was too open to the public. 

Famous players who represented WCC include the professionals John Small, Lumpy Stevens, Tom Taylor and Tom Walker. Records of many WCC matches are known to have been lost when the Lord's Pavilion burned down in 1825 and details of only 13 matches between 1784 and 1788 are known today. Four of the club's matches have been retrospectively awarded first-class cricket status.

History
It is not known for certain when the WCC was founded but it seems to have been after 1780 and certainly by 1785. According to Pelham Warner, it was formed in 1782 as an offshoot from a West End club called the Je-ne-sais-quoi, some of whose members frequented the White Conduit House in Islington and played matches on the neighbouring White Conduit Fields. Arthur Haygarth commented in Scores and Biographies about a 1786 match that "there are only a few recorded matches of the White Conduit Club. The Marylebone Club was formed in 1787 from its members. The date of the formation of the White Conduit could not be found."

Although the club was formed as a gentlemen's club―its rules included one which said the "none but gentlemen ever to play"―professional players were hired to play in matches. The famous batsman Billy Beldham was hired while still a young professional in 1785 and in later life told James Pycroft, author of The Cricket Field (1851), that his farming employer concluded a deal with George Finch, 9th Earl of Winchilsea to allow Beldham time off his agricultural duties to go to the "new cricket ground" at White Conduit Fields and play for Hampshire against All-England.

The White Conduit Club disappeared in the aftermath of MCC's founding, with the core of MCC being formed from WCC's members. White Conduit Fields also disappeared as London expanded and absorbed the village of Islington.

Matches
Details of ten matches played by the club have been found. Four of these have been awarded retrospective first-class status.

As well as these matches, three matches were played in 1787 by a combined White Conduit Club and Moulsey Hurst side against Hornchurch. Two of these matches have been awarded first-class status.

Players
A total of 49 players are known to have appeared in senior matches for White Conduit, with Winchilsea, who played in seven matches, the most frequent. Sir Peter Burrell and John Dampier played in six matches, Gilbert East in five and Richard Newman, George Talbot, G. Drummond of Surrey and J. Wyatt of Essex all played in four.

Notes

References

Bibliography
Birley, Derek (1999) A Social History of English Cricket. London: Aurum Press. </ref>
 
 
 
 

Sports clubs established in the 1780s
Former senior cricket clubs
English cricket teams in the 18th century
1780s establishments in England